The Seafarers Hospital Society, formerly the Seamen's Hospital Society, is a charity for people currently or previously employed by the British Merchant Navy and fishing fleets, and their families. It was established in 1821.

Current activities
The Dreadnought Seamen's Hospital continues to the present day under the NHS as the 'Dreadnought Unit' at St Thomas's Hospital and the dedicated Hospital for Tropical Diseases, part of the University College Hospitals London NHS Trust.

The society currently part-funds the Seafarers' Advice and Information Line, a national advice service operated by the Greenwich Citizens Advice Bureau. In addition it provides funds to nursing and residential care units for seafarers, and helps those in need by providing hardship grants.

Foundation
The first meeting of the society's committee of management was on 8 March 1821 and they initially provided the Seaman's Infirmary hospital ship using the ex-naval HMS Grampus at Deptford in October 1821.

Founding members of the management committee included Thomas Sturge, Zachary Macaulay and Captain William Young. William Wilberforce was one of the many vice presidents, and the patron was the king himself.

19th century

It relocated twice to other ex-naval ships; 1831 to 1857 HMS Dreadnought and then 1857 to 1870 HMS Caledonia (renamed Dreadnought). In June 1866, the Admiralty lent  to the society to enable them to treat cholera patients in London. Following the closure of the Royal Naval Hospital at the site of the Royal Greenwich Hospital in 1869, the society was granted the lease in 1870 and on transferring became known as the Dreadnought Seamen's Hospital, after its last floating home. Thus the Greenwich Hospital switched from the care of ex-members of the Royal Navy to those of the Merchant Navy. Meanwhile, the Dreadnought remained in use as isolation accommodation until 1872.

The Albert Dock Seamen's Hospital was opened in 1890 as a branch of the Dreadnought Seamen's Hospital, Greenwich. The London School of Tropical Medicine was established here in  October 1899, by Sir Patrick Manson, and remained there until moving to Euston in February 1920.

20th century
In 1919 the dedicated Hospital for Tropical Diseases (HTD) was set up by the Seamen's Hospital Society in the Endsleigh Palace Hotel, 25 Gordon Street (near Euston Square in central London). This was evacuated at the start of the Second World War back to the Dreadnought Hospital in Greenwich. The HTD moved temporarily to 23 Devonshire Street in 1947, before being reestablished under the newly formed NHS in 1951 at the site of the St Pancras Hospital in Camden. The HTD moved again in 1998 to new purpose-built premises within part of the University College Hospitals London NHS Trust.

Meanwhile, the in-patient Dreadnought Seamen's Hospital continued at Greenwich until its closure in 1986, with special services for seamen and their families then provided by the 'Dreadnought Unit' at St Thomas's Hospital in Lambeth. This originally consisted of two 28-bed 'Dreadnought wards', but nowadays Dreadnought patients are treated according to clinical need and so are placed in the ward most suitable for their medical condition. Since the formation of the NHS, the Dreadnought Hospital/Unit has been funded by central government with money separate from other NHS trust funds.

21st century

The former hospital building is now being redeveloped to become a new Students' Union & study space as part of the University of Greenwich.

See also
 Healthcare in London
 Royal Hamadryad Hospital, a hospital ship and later a seamen's hospital in Cardiff

References

Further reading

 The Hospital for Tropical Diseases, article on the society's history
 Greenwich Guide's history of Dreadnought Seamen's Hospital/Library

External links
 Seafarers Hospital Society
 Seafarers' Advice & Information Line

Cultural and educational buildings in London
Health in the Royal Borough of Greenwich
Health in the London Borough of Lambeth
Health in the London Borough of Camden
Transport on the River Thames
University College London Hospitals NHS Foundation Trust
Health charities in the United Kingdom
1821 establishments in the United Kingdom
British Merchant Navy
Port of London